Paul S. Berry is a physician, researcher in HIV/AIDS, producer, director, editor, entertainer, and author. He currently works as a nocturnist in a federally designated physician shortage area hospital in Oroville, California.

Biography 
Born in the late 50s, Berry's turbulent childhood sent him to multiple foster homes, a county home for boys and dropping out of high school at age 17. Ultimately, he returned to academics in the early 1980s. It was during the early 80s and his initial years in college while DJing at a nightclub in West Hollywood California called Studio One, that Berry noticed various acquaintances and “party-goers,” who would suddenly become ill and die from what would later come to be known as acquired immune deficiency syndrome. He believed that sexual transmission was implicated in what was then called GRID (Gay-related immune disorder). He abandoned the party disco atmosphere of the early 80s to focus on academics and pursue a career in medicine.

Paul S. Berry attended undergrad at the University of California, Los Angeles, California. He graduated in July 1986 with a Bachelor of Science degree in science and psychobiology. Berry then attended George Washington University Medical School, obtaining his Doctor of Medicine degree in May 1990. He returned to Los Angeles for residency training in internal medicine in 1990.

The AIDS epidemic escalated, and Berry joined Search Alliance, an AIDS research group headed by Dr. Paul Rothman. After Rothman succumbed to AIDS, Berry assumed the position of medical director of Search Alliance (later becoming known as AIDS Research Alliance). In 1992 he served as medical director and member on the board of directors for Search Alliance.

Through the 1990s, HIV/AIDS rapidly became a manageable long term disease in non-third world industrialized nations, and Berry pursued other endeavors. Berry earned a Master of Business Administration from the University of California Irvine and a Juris Doctor from Boalt Hall at the University of California, Berkeley.

Education and training 
 University of California, Los Angeles, California. Bachelor of science, Psychobiology.
 George Washington University in Washington, D.C.  Doctor of Medicine
 Master of Business Administration from the University of California in Irvine, California
 Juris Doctor from Boalt Hall at the University of California at Berkeley

Medical research 
In the 1990s, Paul Berry was involved in the development of a model used for HIV clinical research conducted in the setting of physician's offices. In conjunction with Roche Molecular Systems, Berry was involved in the commercialization of HIV-1 viral quantification via Amplicor, one of the first tests used as a clinical endpoint for the FDA drug approval. He performed the viral load testing for Merck data submission to the U.S. Food and Drug Administration for approval of Crixivan. Berry served as principal investigator on dozens phase II-IV HIV-1 clinical studies. in addition to providing clinical data leading to FDA approval of lamivudine, indinavir, ritonavir and saquinavir.

Media and literary endeavors 
Berry is also involved in media ventures. In 2007, he hosted a radio talk show on KZFR FM, called MedTalk, where he talked about medically related topics.

In 2010, he published his book, Essential advice for Pre-Meds.

Beginning in 2013, Dr. Berry and his spouse Marcelo began to produce, direct, edit and act in their television series Making it with Moraes, and their movie Blow the Duck in 2016, and won ten awards for their TV series at film festivals. The show aired on PBS in Northern California.

Bibliography 

 2010, Essential advice for Pre-Meds

References 

Living people
HIV/AIDS researchers
George Washington University School of Medicine & Health Sciences alumni
Physicians from California
University of California, Los Angeles alumni
University of California, Irvine alumni
UC Berkeley School of Law alumni
American film producers
American medical researchers
American philanthropists
American writers
American film directors
Television producers from California
American actors
Year of birth missing (living people)
American healthcare managers